Obeyyat (also Romanized as ‘Obeyyāt; also known as ‘Obeyd) is a village in Bostan Rural District, Bostan District, Dasht-e Azadegan County, Khuzestan Province, Iran. At the 2006 census, its population was 195, in 27 families.

References 

Populated places in Dasht-e Azadegan County